Michael Gardiner (born 1979) is a former Australian rules footballer.

Michael Gardiner may also refer to:

Michael Gardiner (soldier) (died 1584) Scottish soldier
Mike Gardiner (born 1965), baseball pitcher
Michael R. Gardiner (born 1978), Australian rules footballer for Collingwood

See also
Michael Gardner (disambiguation)